Paul Philippe Cret (October 23, 1876 – September 8, 1945) was a French-born Philadelphia architect and industrial designer. For more than thirty years, he taught at a design studio in the Department of Architecture at the University of Pennsylvania.

Biography 
Born in Lyon, France, Cret was educated at that city's École des Beaux-Arts, then in Paris, where he studied at the atelier of Jean-Louis Pascal. He came to the United States in 1903 to teach at the University of Pennsylvania. Although settled in America, he happened to be in France at the outbreak of World War I. He enlisted and remained in the French army for the duration, for which he was awarded the Croix de Guerre and made an officer in the Legion of Honor.

Cret's practice in America began in 1907. His first major commission, designed with Albert Kelsey, was the Pan American Union Building (the headquarters of what is now the Organization of American States) in Washington DC (1908–10), a breakthrough that led to many war memorials, civic buildings, court houses, and other solid, official structures.

His work through the 1920s was firmly in the Beaux-Arts tradition, but with the radically simplified classical form of the Folger Shakespeare Library (1929–32), he flexibly adopted and applied monumental classical traditions to modernist innovations. Some of Cret's work is remarkably streamlined and forward-thinking, and includes collaborations with sculptors such as Alfred Bottiau and Leon Hermant. In the late 1920s the architect was brought in as design consultant on Fellheimer and Wagner's Cincinnati Union Terminal (1929–33), the high-water mark of Art Deco style in the United States. He became an American citizen in 1927.

In 1931, the regents of The University of Texas at Austin commissioned Cret to design a master plan for the campus, and build the Beaux-Art Main Building (1934–37), the university's signature tower. Cret would go on to collaborate on about twenty buildings on the campus. In 1935, he was elected into the National Academy of Design as an Associate member, and became a full Academician in 1938.

Cret's contributions to the railroad industry also included the design of the side fluting on the Burlington's Pioneer Zephyr (debuted in 1934) and the Santa Fe's Super Chief (1936) passenger cars.

He was a contributor to Architectural Record, American Architect, and The Craftsman. He penned the article "Animals in Christian Art" for the Catholic Encyclopedia.

Cret won the Gold Medal of the American Institute of Architects in 1938. Ill health forced his resignation from teaching in 1937. He served on the U.S. Commission of Fine Arts from 1940 to 1945. After years of limited activity, Cret died in Philadelphia of heart disease and was interred at The Woodlands Cemetery.

Cret's work was displayed in the exhibit, From the Bastille to Broad Street: The Influence of France on Philadelphia Architecture, at the Athenaeum of Philadelphia in 2011. An exhibit of his train designs, All Aboard! Paul P. Cret's Train Designs, was at the Athenaeum of Philadelphia from July 5, 2012 to August 24, 2012. With a collection of 17,000 drawings and more than 3,000 photographs, The Athenaeum of Philadelphia has the largest archive of Paul P. Cret materials.

Legacy
Cret taught in the Department of Architecture at the University of Pennsylvania for over 30 years, and designed such projects as the Rodin Museum in Philadelphia, the master plan for the University of Texas in Austin, the Benjamin Franklin Bridge in Philadelphia, and the Duke Ellington Bridge in Washington, DC. Louis Kahn studied at the University of Pennsylvania under Cret, and worked in Cret's architectural office in 1929 and 1930. Other notable architects who studied under Cret include Alfred Easton Poor, Charles I. Barber, William Ward Watkin, Edwin A. Keeble, Alfred Bendiner, and Chinese architect Lin Huiyin.

Cret designed war memorials, including the National Memorial Arch at Valley Forge National Historical Park (1914–17), the Pennsylvania Memorial at the Meuse-Argonne Battlefield in Varennes-en-Argonne, France (1927), the Chateau-Thierry American Monument in Aisne, France (1930), the American War Memorial at Gibraltar, and the Flanders Field American Cemetery and Memorial in Waregem, Belgium (1937). On the 75th anniversary of the Battle of Gettysburg, President Franklin D. Roosevelt dedicated Cret's Eternal Light Peace Memorial (1938).

For the Pennsylvania Historical Commission, predecessor of the Pennsylvania Historical and Museum Commission (PHMC), Cret designed plaques that would mark places and buildings within the Commonwealth of Pennsylvania where historical events transpired.

Following Cret's death in 1945, his four partners assumed the practice under the partnership Harbeson, Hough, Livingston & Larson, which for years was referred to by staff members as H2L2. The firm officially adopted this "nickname" as its formal title in 1976. H2L2 celebrated 100 years in 2007.

Witold Rybczynski has speculated that Cret is not better known today due to his influence on fascist and Nazi architecture, such as Albert Speer's Zeppelinfeld at the Nuremberg Nazi party rally grounds.

Major projects
 1908–09 – Stock Pavilion, Madison, Wisconsin (with Warren Laird and Arthur Peabody)  
 1908–10 – Organization of American States Building, Washington, D.C. (with Albert Kelsey)
 1914–17 – National Memorial Arch, Valley Forge National Historical Park, Valley Forge, Pennsylvania
 1916–17 – Indianapolis Central Library, Indianapolis, Indiana (with Zantzinger, Borie and Medary)
 1922–26 – Benjamin Franklin Bridge, Philadelphia – Camden, New Jersey
 1923–25 – Barnes Foundation, Merion, Pennsylvania
 1923–27 – Detroit Institute of Arts, Detroit, Michigan (with Zantzinger, Borie and Medary)
 1926–29 – Rodin Museum, Philadelphia (with Jacques Gréber)
 1928–29 – George Rogers Clark Memorial Bridge, Louisville, Kentucky
 1929 – Integrity Trust Company Building, Philadelphia
 1929 – World War I Memorial, Providence, Rhode Island
 1929–32 – Folger Shakespeare Library, Washington, D.C.
 1930 – Chateau-Thierry American Monument, Aisne, France
 1930–32 – Henry Avenue Bridge over Wissahickon Creek, Philadelphia
 1931–32 – Connecticut Avenue Bridge over Klingle Valley, Washington, D.C.
 1932 – Federal Reserve Bank of Philadelphia, 925 Chestnut St., Philadelphia
 1932–33 Hershey Community Center Building, Hershey, Pennsylvania
 1933 – United States Courthouse, consulting architect, Fort Worth, Texas
 1933–34 – Central Heating Plant, Washington, D.C.
 1934–37 – Main Building, University of Texas
 1934–38 – Tygart River Reservoir Dam, near Grafton, West Virginia
 1935 – Duke Ellington Bridge, Washington, D.C.
 1935–37 – Eccles Building, Washington, D.C.
 1935–37 – Hipolito F. Garcia Federal Building and U.S. Courthouse, San Antonio, Texas
 1936 – Dallas Fair Park, Texas Centennial Exposition Buildings at the Texas Centennial Exposition, consulting architect, Dallas
 1936–39 – Texas Memorial Museum, consulting architect, Austin, Texas
 1937 – Flanders Field American Cemetery and Memorial, Waregem, Belgium (with Jacques Gréber)
 1938 – Eternal Light Peace Memorial, Gettysburg Battlefield, Gettysburg, Pennsylvania, Lee Lawrie, sculptor
 1939–44 – National Naval Medical Center, Buildings 1 and 17, consulting architect, Bethesda, Maryland
 1940 – 2601 Parkway, Philadelphia

Gallery

References

External links

 Paul Philippe Cret biography at University of Pennsylvania
 Paul Philippe Cret Papers, University of Pennsylvania 

 
Paul Philippe Cret from Philadelphia Architects and Buildings.

 First chapter of "The Civic Architecture of Paul Cret"
 Paul Philippe Cret architectural drawings, circa 1901-1936. Held by the Department of Drawings & Archives, Avery Architectural & Fine Arts Library, Columbia University.

1876 births
1945 deaths
20th-century American architects
École des Beaux-Arts alumni
American industrial designers
American people in rail transportation
Architects from Lyon
Architects from Philadelphia
Burials at The Woodlands Cemetery
Contributors to the Catholic Encyclopedia
French emigrants to the United States
French military personnel of World War I
Historicist architects
American neoclassical architects
Officiers of the Légion d'honneur
People associated with the Detroit Institute of Arts
University of Pennsylvania faculty
 
Recipients of the AIA Gold Medal
Members of the American Academy of Arts and Letters